The Saratov electoral district was a constituency created for the 1917 Russian Constituent Assembly election.

The electoral district covered the Saratov Governorate. Saratov had been one of the early strongholds of the SRs  Kerensky was one of the SR candidates, but many voters scratched his name from the list (and thus made their votes invalid). was politically turbulent, also during the election. In Saratov Bolshevik campaigners were frequently attacked by rich farmers. Whilst the SR won in the largely agrarian district, the Bolsheviks had a strong showing with strong support from soldiers and from the industrial city of Tsaritsyn. Khvalynsk uezd was an Old Believer stronghold, with presence of Khlysty and Skoptsky sects.

The German socialists didn't field a list in Saratov, whilst the German Central Committee contested on the Volga German List 7.

In Saratov town the Bolsheviks finished in first place with 22,712 votes (37.7%), followed by the SRs with 8,698 votes (14.5%), the Kadets 11,971 votes (19.9%), the Mensheviks 4,100 votes (6.8%), Popular Socialists 2,920 votes (4.9%), the Society for Faith and Order 2,589 votes (4.3%), the Orthodox list 1,924 votes (3.2%), Landowners 1,764 votes (2.9%), Germans 1,280 votes (2.1%), the Ukrainian-Tatar SR list 1,097 votes (1.8%), Old Believers 1,003 votes (1.7%) and 116 votes (0.2%) for the Peasants of Petrovsk uezd and Mordva.

In Tsaritsyn 32,984 votes were cast; 16,613 for the Bolsheviks, 4,468 for the SRs, 2,889 for the Kadets and 2,669 for the Mensheviks.

Results

References

Electoral districts of the Russian Constituent Assembly election, 1917